Mark Van Blarcom Slade (born May 1, 1939) is an American actor, artist, and author, particularly remembered for his role of Billy Blue Cannon on the NBC Western television series, The High Chaparral.

Early life 

Born in Salem, Massachusetts, Slade is the son of Elinor (née Van Blarcom) and William A. Slade Jr., a Boston businessman and watercolor artist. Along with his two sisters and a brother, he grew up in the Danvers/Hamilton area of the North Shore. His parents divorced when he was 13, and his stepfather, Esmond R. Crowley Jr., became a valuable influence on his life.

In 1956, he enrolled in Worcester Academy with the intention of becoming an artist. After he filled in for a sick classmate by playing the role of an English professor in the play The Male Animal, he decided to study acting. Slade moved to New York City to attend the American Academy of Dramatic Arts, supporting himself by working at the 21 Club.

During the beginning of his career in the early 1960s, Slade served in the United States Army Reserve.

Career

Actor

Slade began his career on the Broadway stage appearing in the Josh Logan-directed play, There Was a Little Girl, Jane Fonda's first Broadway play.  He then earned a role in the 1961 film Splendor in the Grass, directed by Elia Kazan and filmed in upstate New York. In the early 1960s, he moved to the West Coast, where he was cast as Seaman Jimmy "Red" Smith in the feature film Voyage to the Bottom of the Sea (1961). Despite his character being killed in the movie version, Irwin Allen brought Slade back for the Voyage to the Bottom of the Sea (TV series) on ABC. He was cast in 1964 as a new character, Seaman Malone. He was hence the only one of six actors to have been cast in both the film and television versions of Voyage to the Bottom of the Sea. He appeared only in the first half of the first season because he departed to become a semi-regular, Eddie, in the CBS sitcom, Gomer Pyle, U.S.M.C., starring Jim Nabors. Slade appeared in eight episodes of Gomer Pyle, all of which were aired during the first half of the first season. He was cast in three episodes of the NBC education drama, Mr. Novak, starring James Franciscus in the title role. His first television role was as Stu Walters in the 1961 episode "Deadline" of the ABC sitcom, My Three Sons, starring Fred MacMurray. In 1963, he was cast in the episode "A Girl Named Amy" of Jack Lord's ABC series, Stoney Burke, a rodeo adventure series. In 1964, he guest-starred in "The Enormous Fist" episode of "Rawhide" opposite Eric Fleming and Clint Eastwood. That year, he also appeared as the title character Michael Manning, alias Michael Da Vinci, in the Perry Mason episode, "The Case of the Careless Kidnapper".

In the 1965–1966 television season, Slade played Radioman Patrick Hollis in the NBC sitcom, The Wackiest Ship in the Army.

In 1966, at the age of 27, he obtained one of his most memorable parts, as Billy Blue Cannon, the blond-haired, blue-eyed son of the ranch patriarch, John Cannon (Leif Erickson) on The High Chaparral, set in the Arizona Territory. The series aired for four seasons. In the same year he was cast in an episode of the western TV series Bonanza as Jud Rikeman.

He went on to play Taylor Reed in the 1973 film Salty and reprised his role in the syndicated adventure series Salty (1974–1975).

Slade's acting career continued into the early 1990s. He made more than 300 appearances on stage, screen, and television. Slade won international recognition and numerous awards for his efforts: the Belgian Viewers Award, the Bambi, the Bravo Golden Otto, and the Western Heritage Award.

Artist

As an artist, Slade's illustrations, political cartoons, caricatures, and comic strips have run in numerous newspapers, magazines, and prominent publications around the world.  His collaboration with producer/writer Danny Arnold (Barney Miller television series) resulted in the long-running comic strip, "Howard and Friends".

A number of his later works done in oils and graphite, as well as his hand-pulled prints, are held in private collections.

Writer

As a writer, Slade is well known for writing and playing the guest role in the "Cliffy" episode of The Rookies television series, which won him critical acclaim and numerous citations.  In 2012, he authored his first published novel,  Going Down Maine, which explores the loss of innocence and unforeseen consequences of youthful indiscretions.  Published in late 2014, Of Pain and Coffee, a collection of sooth-sayings and soliloquies that explore life's foibles and fears, joys and heartbreaks, with illustrations by the author, was released. In December, 2014, Mark published a companion book, Someone's Story, that takes the reader on an emotional journey through those brief moments when one can feel another's life. The author's own photography creates a subtle melding of the pictorial and verse. Hangin' with the Truth, his second novel, was released in 2016.

Slade also lent his talents to the Slade Media Group, founded by his wife, Melinda Riccilli Slade, that specialized in corporate image campaigns, crisis management, graphic design, and marketing communications.  The firm created national campaigns for diverse public and private companies, along with numerous product introductions. Together, they wrote and developed various media projects through their affiliated company, Slade Square Productions.

Personal life

Slade married Melinda Riccilli in 1968. They have two sons, Morgan and Mitchel. He is currently living in Northern California, where he continues the pursuit of his artistic endeavors.

Slade's maternal grandmother, Alice Louise (née Ford) Van Blarcom, was Henry Ford's fifth cousin. His Ford lineage goes back to Martha and John Ford, who reached Plymouth, Massachusetts, on the Fortune, the second English ship to arrive in Plymouth Colony, on November 9, 1621.  John Ford died on the voyage. Martha disembarked with their two sons and gave birth to their third on the same day. The ship's manifest lists among the passengers a John Cannon, also the name of the patriarch in The High Chaparral.

References

External links 
 
 
 marksladestudio.com, Official Website
 What Happened To Blue?

1939 births
Living people
Worcester Academy alumni
American male film actors
American male television actors
American television writers
American male television writers
Writers from Salem, Massachusetts
United States Army soldiers
Western (genre) television actors
Screenwriters from Massachusetts